The 2015 Kennesaw State Owls football team represented Kennesaw State University in the 2015 NCAA Division I FCS football season. They were led by first-year head coach Brian Bohannon and played their home games at Fifth Third Bank Stadium. They were first year members of the Big South Conference. This was the Owls inaugural season of intercollegiate football. They finished the season 6–5, 2–4 in Big South play to finish in a tie for fifth place.

Schedule

Source: Schedule

Game summaries

@ East Tennessee State

Edward Waters

Shorter

@ Dayton

Point

Gardner–Webb

@ Liberty

Monmouth

Charleston Southern

@ Coastal Carolina

@ Presbyterian

References

Kennesaw State
Kennesaw State Owls football seasons
Kennesaw State Owls football